Sam Joe (born 16 April 1989) is an Australian former professional rugby league footballer. He previously played for the Melbourne Storm in the National Rugby League.

Early life
Sam Joe was born in Thursday Island, Torres Strait, Australia, he was educated at St. Brendan's College, Yeppoon.

Sam played his junior rugby league for the Gracemere Cubs. He was then signed by the Melbourne Storm.

Career
Round 13 of the 2008 NRL season. Joe made his NRL debut for the Melbourne Storm against the Titans.

He was named in the Papua New Guinea training squad for the 2008 Rugby League World Cup.

Sam played on the Melbourne Storm wing of the 2009 NRL Under-20s Grand Final victory over the Tigers. He was released by Melbourne before the start of the 2010 season, moving back to Queensland to work in the mines.

References

External links
Melbourne Storm profile

1989 births
Living people
Australian people of Papua New Guinean descent
Australian rugby league players
Melbourne Storm players
Rugby league centres
Rugby league players from Thursday Island
Rugby league wingers